As Scotland is part of the United Kingdom, the British national anthem "God Save the King" is used in Scotland on royal occasions, for example, or when Scottish athletes participate at the Olympics. However, in other situations, other songs are used as de facto Scottish anthems, most notably "Flower of Scotland" and "Scotland the Brave". There have been calls for Scotland to have its own official national anthem.

In 2004, lawyers for the devolved Scottish Parliament advised that it was within the legal competence of the Scottish Parliament to choose a national anthem for Scotland, countering the suggestion that it would be a matter reserved to the Parliament of the United Kingdom. This ruling prompted some interest in the idea, and a petition to the Scottish Parliament's petitions committee supported by the Scottish Green Party was referred without recommendation to the Scottish Executive, but they decided to take no action, considering the issue not to be a political priority. There have been subsequent attempts to re-open the debate on a national anthem for Scotland.

In 2006, the Scottish Parliament  Enterprise Committee denied a motion from Scottish National Party MSP Michael Matheson on the subject.

Current use
At most international sporting events Scotland uses "Flower of Scotland" as its national anthem. These events include matches of the Scottish national football team, Scottish cricket team and the Scottish rugby union team. The song has also been used as the victory anthem of Scotland at the Commonwealth Games since 2010, replacing "Scotland the Brave".

Possible candidates
In June 2006 the Royal Scottish National Orchestra conducted an online opinion poll on their website, asking visitors to choose a favourite to be Scotland's national anthem. With over 10,000 votes cast, "Flower of Scotland" came first with 41% of the votes, followed by "Scotland the Brave" with 29%.

Other songs which have been suggested include Robert Burns' "Auld Lang Syne", and Hamish Henderson's "Freedom Come-All-Ye". Both of these songs, from the 18th and 20th centuries respectively, are written in Lowland Scots.

References

External links
Page with eight candidate songs, with lyrics and comments

Anthem
Scottish culture
Politics of Scotland
Scottish patriotic songs
Scotland